Grzegorz Goncerz (born 27 April 1988 in Kraków) is a Polish professional footballer who plays as a forward for Kotwica Kołobrzeg.

External links
 
 

1988 births
Living people
Footballers from Kraków
Association football forwards
Polish footballers
GKS Katowice players
Górnik Zabrze players
Ruch Chorzów players
Hutnik Nowa Huta players
Kmita Zabierzów players
Podbeskidzie Bielsko-Biała players
Stal Rzeszów players
Kotwica Kołobrzeg footballers
Ekstraklasa players
I liga players
II liga players
III liga players